"I Show You Secrets" is a 1994 song by German Eurodance act Pharao, which consists of Indian/German singer Kyra Pharao (Claudia Banerjee) and American rapper Deon Blue (Marcus Deon Thomas). It was released as the first single from their debut album, Pharao (1994), and was well received among music critics, hitting success in many European countries. The song was a top 10 hit in Austria, Finland, Germany, Israel and Switzerland. Its music video was directed by John Clayton and A-listed on Germany's VIVA.

Critical reception
Larry Flick from Billboard wrote, "Pairing of lovely Indian singer Kyra Pharao and rapper Dean Thomas sparks with chemistry. She flutters over a frenetic pop/rave groove with an angelic quality, while Thomas' guttural rhymes are a fine anchor to the track's glossy synths." Steve Baltin from Cash Box said, "Utterly pretentious in its opening in a way that you can’t help but love, this smash in Germany sounds like some kind of space-age L.S.D. trip through the cosmos." He added, "Going beyond techno, "I Show You Secrets" is a song that is at least interesting, and while everyone knows what that normally means, it’s an accurate word for this song and it’s not an insult. Pharao’s five-song single tries something new." Pan-European magazine Music & Media remarked that the act "is already rapidly climbing the Media Control charts with an imposing housetrack with trancy overtones. This comes as no surprise really, as it easily holds its own against some of its more familiar competitors." John Kilgo from The Network Forty declared it as a "superb dance number".

Chart performance
"I Show You Secrets" was successful on the charts across Europe, reaching the top 10 in Austria, Finland (number three), Germany and Switzerland. Additionally, it was a top
20 hit in Sweden, as well as on the Eurochart Hot 100, where it peaked at number 18 in September 1994. In Belgium, the single went into the top 40, 
while it peaked at number 85 on the UK Singles Chart on November 6, 1994. Outside Europe, it was a huge hit in Israel, where it peaked at number five, and also reached number ten on the RPM Dance/Urban chart in Canada. The act earned a gold record in Germany.

Music video
The accompanying music video for "I Show You Secrets" was directed by John Clayton and filmed in London. It depicts the act in a basement-like surrounding. Singer Kyra sits on a throne, wearing a crown and with a snake around her neck. Rapper Dean Thomas, shirtless and sometimed with blue sunglasses, stands by her side. They are surrounded by burning fires, wires, dancers performing on a staircase-like stage and a man with an owl. Throughout the video, Egyptian hieroglyphs can be seen several times. The crown Kyra wears was handmade especially for her. The video was A-listed on Germany's VIVA in August 1994.

Track listing
 CD maxi
"I Show You Secrets" (Radio Version) – 4:15
"I Show You Secrets" (Mystery Of Music Mix) – 6:10
"I Show You Secrets" (The Secret Mind Of Trance) – 6:10
"I Show You Secrets" (Mystic Instrumental) – 4:55

 CD maxi - Remixes
"I Show You Secrets" (Video Version) – 4:02
"I Show You Secrets" (New Mystery Of Music Mix) – 6:24
"I Show You Secrets" (Inside Your Mind Trance Mix) – 6:11
"I Show You Secrets" (Temple Dancers' Trance Trip) – 5:50

Charts and certifications

Weekly charts

Year-end charts

References

1994 debut singles
1994 songs
Dance Pool singles
English-language German songs
Music videos directed by John Clayton
Pharao songs